Halcyon is a science fiction television series that debuted September 2016 on the Syfy network. The show was billed as a "virtual reality series,” consisting of both traditional televised content and 3D/VR media which could be experienced on devices such as the Oculus Rift and Gear VR. The series was produced by production company Secret Location and directed by Benjamin Arfmann. The show ran for 15 episodes, including ten "short form" traditional digital broadcasts, and an additional five episodes of interactive virtual reality. The show stars Lisa Marcos as Jules Dover, a detective using a VI implant to solve murders.

Series details
The series takes place at a Virtual Reality company in 2058, called Halcyon, but will be a crime/murder mystery drama, with character Jules Dover (Lisa Marcos) as the detective of a "VR Crimes Unit".

While there have been virtual reality "shows" that were simply shot in 360° and/or 3D, Halcyon is billed as actually including interaction between the user and "clues" for each murder mystery.

Cast & Characters
Jules Dover (Lisa Marcos) is a highly capable homicide detective fully committed to her work—solving crimes that take place in the virtual world. She’s got some very real skeletons in her closet and is haunted by a painful past. Regardless, Jules is the kind of brass you assign to impossible cases because she has a knack for figuring out even the most twisted mysteries and solving the unsolvable. Where others fail, Jules Dover will succeed.
Asha (Harveen Sandhu) is a Virtual Intelligence (VI), a fully functioning digital person with her own thoughts, feelings, and motivations. As Jules' assistant on cases, Asha is visible to anyone able to access VR through Halcyon's implant technology. Asha is a smart and valuable ally to Jules, yet she is hyper-aware of the limitations associated with being virtual, namely, that she is physically untouchable.
Blake Creighton (Michael Therriault) knows how to take an idea and sensationalize, package and sell it to the public. He is the main driving force behind nanotechnology in VR being adopted on a global scale. Blake is a hero of the tech-world and force to be reckoned with, making it worldwide news when he's found dead in his apartment, with no apparent cause of death.
Gavin Spencer (Victor Ertmanis) is the co-founder and former CEO of Halcyon. A brilliant technological philosopher, he is responsible for the advent of nanotechnology in VR, and his work has influenced the way people live their day-to-day lives. Once a vocal advocate for virtual life, Gavin has since disappeared, and not even his former confidants know where or how to find him.
Alan (Cody Ray Thompson) is Blake Creighton’s Virtual Intelligence (VI) assistant. He's highly intelligent, servile, and accommodating; in fact, he’s a model virtual citizen and many wish other VIs would follow his lead. Having been so close to Halcyon's co-founder and CEO since the company’s infancy, Alan understands the inner workings of the multinational corporation like no one else.
Miranda Reyes (Claire Rankin) is the Halcyon executive who replaces Blake Creighton as CEO following his unexpected death. Miranda is a driven and high-performing career woman whose focus is always on the bottom line. She believes passionately in the power of Halcyon technology in the new virtual world. Miranda also believes that to preserve the greater order of things, VIs must understand their place.
Dylan Higgins (Andrew di Rosa) is a Halcyon technician with some questionable ties to the anti-VR Humanist movement. An expert in Halcyon nanotech software, Dylan has helped to develop some of the company's most popular products. He recognises the profound benefits of VR, but is also all too familiar with the consequences when the line between VR and the real world becomes blurred.

Episodes

References

External links
 
 Halcyon trailer
 Halcyon Series Sneak Peek

2010s Canadian science fiction television series
2016 Canadian television series debuts
2016 Canadian television series endings
2010s American science fiction television series
2016 American television series debuts
2016 American television series endings
Syfy original programming